The Winternats is a competitive on-road gas powered radio controlled car race attended by racers from around the world. It is held annually in Fort Myers, Florida at the Lee County Civic Center, usually in the month of February. The Winternats is one of the oldest major R/C car racing events.

This event is sanctioned by the Radio Operated Auto Racing, or ROAR of North America and Canada. ROAR rules are followed. On-road gas (nitro) powered classes are 1/8 scale open, 1/8 scale masters and 1/10 scale sedan.

History

The first Winternats
The first Winternats was held in Miami, Florida in 1972. It was organized 
and put on by the South Florida R/C Car Club. The club had a temporary track that was striped and sealed on the side of a Levitz Furniture store parking lot. Two of the local hobby shops supported the club. Crown Hobbies paid for the site insurance and Orange Blossom Hobbies furnished the trophies. A few of the members came up with the idea of putting on a "BIG" race. From that idea of a "BIG" race the club started a monthly newsletter that was mailed out nationally. The ‘local’ club became known on a National level. Not knowing when to have this "BIG" race or what to call it, somewhere the idea came up to have a Winternationals. The club decided to capitalize on the great weather and the Annual King Orange Jamboree, a long-standing Miami tradition at that time. The club checked with the King Orange Committee, they had no problems with the club using their name and the "BIG" race was on. January, 1972 the first Annual King Orange Winternationals was to be held in sunny South Florida! The club put this in their Newsletter with the entry applications, and entries poured in from all over the country. This was the "first" R/C Winternationals in the country. The first winner was John Thorpe of Pomona California, driving a belt driven car that he manufactured, called the Thorpe Car. Other attendees were Art Carbonell and the Campbells of Delta and Dick Dobson of Marker. The trophies were silver bowls filled with oranges.

Early years
The South Florida R/C Car Club in Miami held the first races from 1972 to 1975. At that time there were no nitro sedans, impacts, or 4WD pivot ball cars. It was all 2WD 1/8 scale pan cars (made by Delta, Associated, Marker Machine) powered by K&B or OPS .21 engines.

In 1976, the event was moved to the parking lot of a Howard Johnson's in Orlando, Florida. This coincided with the starting of the Florida On-Road Gas State Series. In the early 80s, the race took place at the first permanent track in Florida, located at the Orlando airport. Kim Davis was the race director.

The race really started to become well known around the world when top European drivers and IFMAR representatives began to attend.

Fort Myers
Bob Rule of Bolink asked Jim Rice, the President of the Fort Myers R/C Car Club, to take over running the race and the race was moved to Fort Myers. In 1988 and 1989 the event took place at a semi-permanent location at the Edison Mall in downtown Ft. Myers. Since 1990 the race has been held at the Lee County Civic Center.  The warm Florida weather during the middle of the winter helped to increase the popularity, since most nitro R/C racers couldn't race during the winter months. With drivers from around the world attending and manufacturers competing with their latest innovations, the race used the slogan 'Test Track to the World'.

Race name
The race was first called the ‘King Orange Winternationals’. In a few years, the race was promoted as the ‘Winter Nationals’. In the 1980s, the race was briefly known as ‘The Miller’ because of a sponsorship from the Miller Brewing Company. ROAR did not sanction the race in 1988 due to a disagreement over the naming of the race. Private insurance for the race was purchased by the Fort Myers R/C Car Club (FMRC) and a new name, the ‘Southern Gas Championship Race’ was used. Next year (1989) ROAR and FMRC came to an agreement on naming the race the ‘Winternats’. ROAR was again the insurer and sanctioning body. The race was promoted under both the Winternats and Southern Gas Championship Race names. Finally, in recent years the race is known simply as the Winternats.

Track features 
This track is considered to be one of the most unforgiving R/C tracks in the world with a very fast and narrow driving line. The track's nickname, 'The Fort', has been earned over many years of battle with drivers. The 30-year-old galvanized steel 'boards' make a loud bang exaggerating every hit, but yielding little. In the late 90s, plastic guards were added to many of the most destructive corners in an effort to tame the track. If a car is on line through the large sweeper onto the straight your car will disappear briefly because of the concrete curbs that create the island. The chicane in front of the driver stand, 'aka Dead Mans Curve', is one of the toughest spots on the track as drivers try to negotiate this tight area without lifting. The dots (plow disks) on the carousel were recently tamed in 2005, when they were covered by a plastic loop. The start–finish lap timing loop is located just before the pits, requiring drivers to make almost a whole lap before starting their qualifying run. This makes the 5-minute qualifiers a battle between power and fuel mileage. Some drivers will make a pit stop during qualifying. Before the 2005 event new asphalt was laid, due to damage by Hurricane Charley, and for the first time Mike Swauger and Michael Salven were able to complete 26 laps during qualifying. In 2008, live scoring over the internet was added, to allow people from around the world to view the races in real time. In 2009, live video coverage and audio of the race announcers was added to the site without a fee. Thanks to good weather and lots of traction compound testing during the summer, DJ Apolaro was able to set the first 24 lap qualifier in a sedan and Mike Swauger turned the first 27 lap qualifier with a 1/8 scale car. Paolo Morganti would set a new track record for the sedan at 24 laps in 5:11.71 and Mike Swauger 27 laps in 5:10.97 with a 1/8 scale car.

Practice 

Practice days are on Monday through Wednesday from 8:00 AM till 5:00 PM. In the middle of the day, practice sessions are sorted into 1/8 and sedan classes.  No fuel bottles or refueling is allowed inside the fenced-in track area to allow all drivers the chance to get practice.  Severe penalties from the officials for breaking this rule include reprimands, loss of fuel bottle or being sent home.

Qualifying 

Takes place from Thursday through Friday. Qualifiers are four minutes long using the IFMAR start with up to ten drivers racing on their own clock.  A maximum of five qualifiers are run over a two-day period.  Practice is allowed in the mornings from 8:00 AM till 9:00 AM and in the evenings from the end of qualifying till 5:00 PM.  Drivers are required to turn marshal after their qualifier or they will be docked one lap from their best qualifier.

Mains 

The mains are run over a two-day period.  The lower mains are run on Friday. The upper mains are run on Saturday.  Mains are run from the lowest to the highest (A-main).  The winner and runner-up of all mains below the A-main, are allowed the option to bump-up to the next main.  Trophies are awarded to all A-main participants and the top three places in all mains. Bump-up drivers give up their trophy for the chance to race in the next main.

Traditions 

A free barbecue prepared by Jim on Friday night after the lower mains, consisting of smoked pork and chicken as well as all the fixings, is a unique feature only provided at this event. A raffle including car kits, engines, radios, tires, tools, etc., donated by the race sponsors, contributes to the appeal of this race. Silver bullets and the Red Cup racing team can trace its origins to the long days and nights of a Winternats week. In recent years, this race has been held in mid-February. The attendance of pro drivers, manufacturers and race teams make this race a great learning experience for racers.

Winners

1/8 scale 4wd

1/10 Scale Sedan

1/8 Scale Masters

1/8 Scale GT

1/10 Scale 4wd

1/10 scale 2wd

1/8 scale 2wd

References

External links 
 Remotely Operated Auto Racers 
 Winternats home page

Radio-controlled racing
Recurring sporting events established in 1972
1972 establishments in Florida